Da gelo a gelo ("From one frost to the next") is an opera in 100 scenes (some lasting as little as 3') by Salvatore Sciarrino.  The composer's Italian libretto is based on one year (1002-03) and 65 poems from the journal of Izumi Shikibu encompassing her affair with Prince Atsumishi.

The opera was a co-commission of the Schwetzingen Festival, the Grand Théâtre de Genève  and the Opéra National de Paris and premiered in the Schlosstheater Schwetzingen under the German title Kälte on 21 May 2006. The choreography for the singers by Trisha Brown was retained for the 2007 Paris production at the Palais Garnier. The piece lasts 110 minutes.

Roles

Instrumentation
The instrumentation is  S, Ms, 2 Ct, Bar / 3 (II Fl.c in Sol, III Fl.b). 3 (III C.i). 3 (III Cl.b). 2 / 2. 3. 2. -. / Perc / strings (min. 10. 8. 6. 4. 4.)

External links
 1627 Score published by Rai Trade, Rome
 interview with Sciarrino (in French)
 review of premiere in Neue Zürcher Zeitung
 review of booed Paris opening by Jorg von Uthmann (English)
 contrasting review from Libération

Operas
2006 operas
Italian-language operas
Operas by Salvatore Sciarrino
Operas set in Japan